"Sweet Surrender" is a song by Canadian singer Sarah McLachlan. It was released in 1997 as the second single from her fourth studio album, Surfacing (1997). The song peaked at number two in Canada and number 28 on the US Billboard Hot 100. In 2001, a maxi-single with remixes by DJ Tiesto was released peaking at number six on the US Hot Dance Club Play chart, three years after its original release.

Music video
The music video was directed by Floria Sigismondi (as Allen Smithee).

Track listings
US and Australian CD single
 "Sweet Surrender" (album version) – 4:02
 "Sweet Surrender" (radio mix) – 4:07
 "Sweet Surrender" (Roni Size remix) – 7:16
 "Sweet Surrender" (Überzone remix) – 4:29

US cassette single
 "Sweet Surrender" (album version)
 "Sweet Surrender" (radio mix)
 "Sweet Surrender" (Roni Size remix)

European CD single
 "Sweet Surrender" (Boilerhouse remix) – 3:58
 "Sweet Surrender" (album version) – 4:00

Personnel
Personnel are lifted from the Surfacing liner notes.
 Sarah McLachlan – writing, vocals, electric guitar, piano
 Brian Minato – electric guitars
 Michel Pepin – electric guitars
 Pierre Marchand – bass, drum machine, production, recording, mixing
 Ash Sood – drums, percussion

Charts

Weekly charts

Year-end charts

References

External links
  (licensed content by Sony BMG)

1997 singles
Sarah McLachlan songs
Arista Records singles
Nettwerk Records singles
Music videos credited to Alan Smithee
Music videos directed by Floria Sigismondi
Songs written by Sarah McLachlan